Ramavarappadu is a residential hub located in the East-Central part of Vijayawada in Krishna district of the Indian state of Andhra Pradesh. It is located in Vijayawada (rural) mandal of Vijayawada revenue division. As per the G.O. No. M.S.104 (dated:23-03-2017), Municipal Administration and Urban Development Department, it became a part of Vijayawada metropolitan area.It is surrounded by Prasadampadu on the East, Gunadala on the West, Kanuru and Currency Nagar on the south.

Demographics 

The total population constitute,  males,  females and  children, in the age group of 0–6 years. The average literacy rate stands at 81.02% with  literates, significantly higher than the national average of 73.00%.

Transport 
Ramavarappadu well connected to many other parts of City and out of the city
Rail Ways
Ramavarappadu railway station is one of major railway stations of the city .It also serves as satellite station of vijayawada junction Ramavarappadu railway station comes under  Vijayawada railway division of South Central Railway zone

Road ways
Ramavarappadu was located on NH-16 Chennai- Kolkata Highway. Ramavarappadu ring holds hug traffic.Ramavarappadu ring was well connected with cities like Hyderabad,Visakhapatnam,Eluru and it's has two bus stops for city buses
Ramavarappadu centre 
Ramavarappadu ring
Air ways
Vijayawada international airport was located at gannavaram is about 16 kms

Education 
The primary and secondary school education is imparted by government, aided and private schools, under the School Education Department of the state.

See also 
List of census towns in Andhra Pradesh

References 

Neighbourhoods in Vijayawada